"I Don't Want to Go On Without You" is soul ballad written by Bert Berns and Jerry Wexler and produced by Bert Berns for The Drifters in 1964.

Covers
"I Don't Want to Go On Without You" has been covered by Nazareth, The Escorts (1965), The Moody Blues, The Searchers, Patti LaBelle and The Bluebelles, Van Morrison and many others.

Dusty Springfield gave an acclaimed performance of "I Don't Want to Go On Without You" on show 4 of her first television series Dusty on 8 September 1966. It has been praised as a highlight of her well-received first series. The performance was included on the Dusty Springfield DVD release Live at the BBC on 8 October 2007.

History
Originally intended to be the A-side to "Under the Boardwalk", the song was recorded in May 1964 under the direction of songwriter and producer Bert Berns. The night before the session, The Drifters' lead singer, Rudy Lewis, died of a heroin overdose. Longtime Drifters tenor Charlie Thomas took over the vocal.

References

1964 singles
The Drifters songs
Songs written by Bert Berns
The Moody Blues songs
The Searchers (band) songs
Van Morrison songs
Songs written by Jerry Wexler
Nazareth (band) songs
1964 songs
Atlantic Records singles
Song recordings produced by Bert Berns